Raymond "Ray" Wilkins (born 3 October 1950) is a Welsh former professional rugby footballer who played in the 1960s, 1970s and 1980s.

Background
Ray Wilkins was born in Neath, Wales.

Playing career

International honours
Ray Wilkins won a cap for Wales (RU) at under-15 in 1965, was captain in 1966, and won an under-19 cap in 1969, and won 2 caps for Wales (RL) in 1977 while at Workington Town.

County Cup Final appearances
Ray Wilkins played right-, i.e. number 3, and scored a try in Workington Town's 11-16 defeat by Widnes in the 1976 Lancashire County Cup Final during the 1976–77 season at Central Park, Wigan on Saturday 30 October 1976, played , and scored a try in the 16-13 victory over Wigan in the 1977 Lancashire County Cup Final during the 1977–78 season at Wilderspool Stadium, Warrington on Saturday 29 October 1977, and played left-, i.e. number 4, and scored a try in the 13-15 defeat by Widnes in the 1978 Lancashire County Cup Final during the 1978–79 season at Central Park, Wigan on Saturday 7 October 1978.

References

External links
(archived by web.archive.org) A Brief History of Aberavon RFC

1950 births
Living people
Aberavon RFC players
Rugby league fullbacks
Rugby league players from Neath
Rugby union players from Neath
Wales national rugby league team players
Welsh rugby league players
Welsh rugby union players
Workington Town players